Gordon William Shedden (born 15 February 1979) is a Scottish auto racing driver, currently competing in the British Touring Car Championship for the Halfords Racing with Cataclean team. He has previously won the series on three occasions; in 2012, 2015 and 2016, driving for Honda/Team Dynamics each time. He also spent two seasons in the FIA WTCR, from 2018 to 2019, driving for the Audi Sport Leopard Lukoil Team.

Racing career

Early years
Born in Edinburgh, Shedden began racing in the Ford Fiesta Championship in 1999 with Tim Norton Motor Services Ltd. Racing Team, www.timnortonnmotors.co.uk, and won it the following season with 9 wins. He raced in the SEAT Cupra Championship, finishing as runner-up in 2003 and 4th in 2004. He also made a one-off appearance in the Production Class of the BTCC at Knockhill in 2001, and at the same circuit in the Porsche Carrera Cup Great Britain in 2005. He was entered in the 2002 BTCC by GR Motorsport in an Alfa Romeo, but this never reached the track. He has worked as Business Development Manager for the Knockhill circuit, alongside his wife Jillian. He has raced at Macau several times.

British Touring Car Championship

Team Dynamics (2006–2009)

For 2006, Shedden was chosen by Team Halfords to drive for them in the BTCC, alongside reigning series champion Matt Neal, noting that "it's brilliant to have a teammate that I can learn so much from". He took his first win in the series in race 7 at Oulton Park, and added another in round 10 at Thruxton, where he also took his first pole position. He finished 4th overall with five wins in 2006, finishing the season as rookie of the year. In 2007 his team switched to the Honda Civic, and again took four wins. He was again 4th overall ahead of Neal.

In 2008 he was the team leader alongside Tom Chilton, with Neal leaving to join VX Racing. He took a 2nd place in the season opener, but crashed heavily in race 3. He did not achieve a podium finish at Donington Park, and at Thruxton he led races 1 and 3, but suffered punctures on lap 8 of both races. He was placed in 7th in the Drivers Championship.

2009 saw Shedden joined at Team Dynamics (previously Team Halfords) by former Luton Town F.C. Chairman, David Pinkney. He also took on a new role as Team Ambassador for new racing team, YourRacingCar.com who contested their first year together in the BTCC support series, the Ginetta G50 Cup. He was ranked 9th in the Drivers Standings but was later replaced by James Thompson.

CVR and GR Asia (2009)

On 15 April 2009 it was announced that James Thompson would be replacing Shedden in the Team Dynamics car for the remainder of the 2009 season. The team said it was working on funds for a 3rd car for Gordon to run later in the season. However, before the round at Snetterton Shedden was signed by Clyde Valley Racing. After competing at two events for the team, they withdrew from the rest of the season. After missing the Silverstone round, Shedden rejoined the series at the penultimate round with the same bio-ethanol SEAT León that he raced for CVR, under the Club SEAT banner. Despite all the changes Shedden managed 2 podiums during 2009 and finished up in 12th in the Drivers Standings.

Honda Racing (2010–2017)

After Team Dynamics became an official manufacturer Honda team ahead of the 2010 season, Shedden and Neal were re-signed by the team. Shedden secured pole position for the first race of the season at Thruxton, he led the opening race but suffered a 125 mph shunt as a result of a puncture. Shedden won 2 races at Croft Circuit followed by wins at Snetterton, Knockhill and Donington and finished 3rd in the Drivers Championship.

Shedden remained with Honda for the 2011 season with the Honda Civic now powered by an NGTC turbocharged engine. He finished the drivers championship in second place, 8 points behind his team mate Matt Neal having been his only title challenger at the penultimate race of the season.

Shedden stayed with Honda in 2012, driving the new full-NGTC Honda Civic. His teammate would Matt Neal for the third year in a row. He had a disappointing opening round at Brands Hatch, his car was plagued with electrical problems for much of the weekend. He was disqualified from the third race of the day after his team worked on his car during the red flag period. Things improved at the next round where Shedden took two wins from three races, including one inherited due to penalties for Mat Jackson and Jason Plato. Problems for Plato at Oulton Park and good results put him in the championship lead after the first race. He was second in the championship going into the summer break, one point behind team-mate Neal. When the season resumed at Snetterton, Shedden's car caught fire in the first free practice session. Shedden finished third in race three but post-race scrutineering found that his Honda had been over-boosting, thus disqualifying him from the results. He won two of the three races at Rockingham in wet conditions where he regained the championship lead. Shedden secured his first BTCC title in race two at Brands Hatch, finishing second behind Aron Smith.

The Honda team retained Shedden and Neal for 2013 in a pair of Honda Civics. He was excluded from the second race at the season opening Brands Hatch round having failed the ride height test, elevating Jeff Smith to the final podium spot. He went on to finish 2nd in the standings just 7 points away from retaining his crown.

2014 saw the Honda team make the switch to run the new Honda tourer model for a year. It happened to be fairly unsuccessful however. Shedden managed two wins, 8 podiums and finished up 3rd in the drivers championship.

For 2015 the team ran a pair of brand new Honda Type Rs. Shedden took the cars first win in just the second race of the season. In what was to be one of the most tense and dramatic title showdowns ever. Shedden took the title by just 4 points from Jason Plato and thus his second drivers title.

Halfords returned as the team's main sponsor for 2016 a full 10 years since they took Matt Neal to his second drivers title. Shedden hit the ground running with a win at the first round. However a lean spell mid season due to some bad luck saw Shedden sitting 9th in the standings at the halfway point. In the second half of the season Shedden would take 3 wins and 4 podiums to claw back the points deficit to BMW's Sam Tordoff. In the last race of the season Shedden overtook Tordoff to clinch his third championship title. Shedden became the first man to successfully defend his crown since Fabrizio Giovanardi in 2008.

World Touring Car Cup

Audi Sport WRT (2018–2019)
In January 2018, Shedden announced his departure from Team Dynamics, stating he was moving onto “pastures new”. It was later announced that he would switch to the World Touring Car Cup championship, driving for the W Racing Team Audi works team. In December 2019 the WRT team announced it will not be running in 2020 in the World Touring Cup leaving Gordon without a seat.

Top Gear
Shedden has made multiple appearances on Top Gear. His first appearance came in Series 12, Episode 5, where he drove a Mercedes-Benz O305G Articulated bus in a bus race. In Series 14, Episode 4, he drove an articulated bus in the airport vehicles race. In series 20, episode 2, he participated in and won a taxi race driving a Hindustan Ambassador.

Racing record

Complete British Touring Car Championship results
(key) Races in bold indicate pole position (1 point awarded – 2001 all races, 2006–present just in first race, 2001 in class) Races in italics indicate fastest lap (1 point awarded – 2001–present all races, 2001 in class) * signifies that driver lead race for at least one lap (1 point given – 2001–present all races)

Complete British GT Championship results
(key) (Races in bold indicate pole position) (Races in italics indicate fastest lap)

Complete TCR International Series results
(key) (Races in bold indicate pole position) (Races in italics indicate fastest lap)

Complete World Touring Car Cup results
(key) (Races in bold indicate pole position) (Races in italics indicate fastest lap)

† Driver did not finish the race, but was classified as he completed over 90% of the race distance.

References

External links

 Official site
 Article on YRC Ambassador
 Profile at BTCCPages.com
 btcc:action profile
 Article on Gordon's BTCC entry
 Article on his Carrera entry

1979 births
Living people
British Touring Car Championship drivers
British Touring Car Championship Champions
British GT Championship drivers
Scottish racing drivers
Sportspeople from Edinburgh
Alumni of Heriot-Watt University
24 Hours of Spa drivers
Porsche Carrera Cup GB drivers
World Touring Car Cup drivers
W Racing Team drivers
TCR International Series drivers
Audi Sport drivers
Chinese F4 Championship drivers